DJ Stingray, or Sherard Ingram, is the founder of Urban Tribe and associate of legendary Detroit electro duo Drexciya. As both a DJ and producer, Ingram specializes in futuristic electro, preferring fast tempos and inventive beat patterns to more accessible, club-friendly rhythms. When asked to describe his style of electronic music, he prefers to classify it as Techno.

Taught how to DJ by Kenny Dixon Jr. (Moodymann) in the mid-1980s, he gradually developed and perfected his dense, high-speed mixing style while DJing at biker bars (such as The Outcast) in Detroit, slipping bits of techno tracks in with Miami booty bass and West Coast electro and hip-hop.

In the late 1980s, while working at the record shop Buy-Rite Music, he met the late James Stinson of Drexciya, and eventually they became friends. Shortly thereafter Stinson asked Ingram to be the opening DJ for Drexciya's tour. At that time, the name DJ Stingray was given to Ingram. "Did I feel like a stingray? Never. But I wasn't going to argue with James Stinson. I felt it and I understood what he wanted, because I understood the Drexciya legacy," he said. "I was Stingray from that day on." At that time, he also started to use his signature balaclava, which at first was supposed to be the same Underground Resistance mask used by the rest of the crew. Ingram quickly switched it out for a SWAT mask since it was more comfortable.

References 

Year of birth missing (living people)
Living people
American electro musicians
Stingray
African-American musicians
American techno musicians
21st-century African-American people